Miconia floccosa is a species of plant in the family Melastomataceae. It is endemic to Peru.

References

floccosa
Endemic flora of Peru
Vulnerable flora of South America
Taxonomy articles created by Polbot
Taxa named by Alfred Cogniaux